Golden dream can refer to:

 The Brough Superior Golden Dream motorcycle
Golden dream (cocktail), an IBA official cocktail made with the uncommon Liquore Galliano and Cointreau
Golden Dream (song), the theme song for "The American Adventure" attraction at Epcot in Walt Disney World, also used in "Great Moments with Mr. Lincoln" at Disneyland
Golden Dreams (1922 film), a 1922 American adventure film based upon a Zane Grey story
Golden Dreams, a 2001 film about California's history at Disney's California Adventure
Golden Dream: A Fuzzy Odyssey, a novel by Ardath Mayhar